Corinth is an unincorporated community in Bullock County, Alabama, United States, located  south of Union Springs.

References

Unincorporated communities in Bullock County, Alabama
Unincorporated communities in Alabama